Petrov (masculine) or Petrova (feminine) may refer to:

People
Petrov (surname)
Petrova (surname)
Petrov, code name of Romanian politician Traian Băsescu as informant for Romanian intelligence agencies

Places
4785 Petrov, an asteroid (minor planet)
Petrov (crater), a lunar crater
Petrov (Blansko District), a municipality and village in the Czech Republic
Petrov (Hodonín District), a municipality and village in the Czech Republic
Petrov (Prague-West District), a municipality and village in the Czech Republic
Petrov nad Desnou, a municipality and village in the Czech Republic
Petrov, a hill in Brno
Petrov, Russia (Petrova), name of several rural localities in Russia
Petrova, Maramureș, a commune in Romania
Petrová, a village in Slovakia

Other
Petrova (moth)

See also
Petrov Affair, a Cold War spy scandal in Australia, centered on Soviet diplomat Vladimir Petrov
Petrov's Defence, an opening in chess
Petrof (disambiguation)